This article lists albums that were originally released by Fearless Records.

Studio albums

1990s

2000s

2010s

Extended plays

Compilation albums

Punk Goes

Punk Goes... is a series of albums released by Fearless Records in which "punk rock" bands perform covers of songs from other genres. As of 2014, the series consists of sixteen compilation albums.

Though predominantly a series of cover albums, Punk Goes Acoustic, Punk Goes Acoustic 2 and Punk Goes Acoustic 3 completely deviate from this theme, featuring only acoustic versions of original songs by the featured bands, while 2013's Punk Goes Christmas features a mix of both Christmas-themed original songs and covers. Similarly, the series' first installment, 2000's Punk Goes Metal, consists entirely of covers with the exception of "Why Rock?" performed by The Aquabats, which was in fact an original song credited to a fictitious band called "Leather Pyrate".

Videography

References
Primary
 

Secondary

See also
 Fearless Records official website
 Fearless Records releases

Discographies of American record labels